Nuestra Belleza Yucatán 2010, was held at the Club Libanés in Mérida, Yucatán on July 17, 2010. At the conclusion of the final night of competition María Fernanda López of Mérida was crowned the winner. López was crowned by outgoing Nuestra Belleza Yucatán titleholder and Nuestra Belleza Mundo México 2009 Anabel Solis. Seven contestants competed for the title.

Results

Placements

Background Music
Marco Di Mauro

Contestants

References

External links
Official Website

Nuestra Belleza México